China competed at the 2015 UCI Track Cycling World Championships in Saint-Quentin-en-Yvelines at the Vélodrome de Saint-Quentin-en-Yvelines from 18–22 February 2015. A team of 21 cyclists (12 women, 9 men) was announced to represent the country in the event.

Results

Men

Sources

Women

Sources

2016

China competed at the 2016 UCI Track Cycling World Championships at the Lee Valley VeloPark in London, United Kingdom from 2–4 March 2016. A team of 20 cyclists (11 women, 9 men) was announced to represent the country in the event.

Results

Men

Sources

Women

Sources

References

China at cycling events